iD is a video game developed by Mel Croucher and Colin Jones for the ZX Spectrum and published by CRL in 1986. The game is text-based and takes the form of a conversation with an entity that has inhabited the computer. The player's task is to gain the entity's trust and find out what other inanimate objects this entity has inhabited in the past.

External links  
Some background information
id at GameFAQs

1986 video games
Video games developed in the United Kingdom
ZX Spectrum-only games
ZX Spectrum games